Ifjord is a village in the municipality of Lebesby in Finnmark, Norway. It is located at the bottom of Ifjorden, a branch of Laksefjorden.

References

Villages in Finnmark
Lebesby